Kasi is a 2001 Indian Tamil-language drama film written and directed by Vinayan. The film has Vikram playing the eponymous character of a blind village singer. A remake of the director's own Malayalam film Vasanthiyum Lakshmiyum Pinne Njaanum (1999), the film has Kaveri reprising her role from the original and Kavya Madhavan making her Tamil debut in supporting roles. The film was produced by Aroma Mani for Sunitha Productions. The film score and soundtrack was composed by Ilaiyaraaja.

The film was released on 14 December 2001 and won positive reviews from critics upon release. Vikram won the Filmfare Best Actor Award and Cinema Express Award for Best Actor – Tamil.

Plot 
Kasi is a tale about the deception of appearances. Kasi (Vikram) is a blind poet and talented singer who supports his family by his songs. He lives in a village in Tanjore district and has an older brother Sevalai (Thalaivasal Vijay), who is a drunkard; an abusive, crippled father; and a younger sister Lakshmi (Kavya Madhavan).  When the local landlord and former MP Raghupathi (Rajeev) returns to the district, he promises to help the locals. Raghupathi has a reputation as a God in the area because of his charitable works, and when a specialist eye doctor arrives, he promises to pay the fees for an operation to give back Kasi's vision. Elated by this news, Kasi learns that he has to find an eye donor. His lover Kaveri (Kaveri), who cannot speak, offers one of her eyes. Weeks later he receives Dinesh, the son of a powerful Union minister and his wife Radhika (Aishwarya).  Unfortunately, the 'God-like' Raghupathi and Dinesh are not what they seem. Blissfully unaware of the sadness of those around him, Kasi looks forward to his operation. One morning, on the day of operation, Lakshmi was found dead and it is figured out that she commits suicide because of Raghupati and when Raghupati comes to attend the funeral, Kasi explains to Raghupati of what he did as he kills Raghupati by choking him.

Cast

Production 
Simran was offered the role of Lakshmi, Vikram's sister but she refused the offer because she didn't want to act in a supporting role. Then Malayalam actress Kavya Madhavan  accepted the character after being impressed by its original Malayalam version. The shooting was completed in just 45 days.

While preparing to play a blind singer  Vikram practised drawing his eyeballs up into their sockets so that only the whites could be seen. Once the shoot started, he would roll his eyeballs up through the whole day on the set, and would subsequently do eye exercises at the end of the day's shoot so that he wouldn not end up with a squint. His eyesight was later weakened as a result of his work on the film. To achieve a darker skin tone, he sunbathed on the terrace of his beachside home in Chennai for a sunburnt look.

Soundtrack 

The soundtrack album was composed by Ilaiyaraaja. All the songs have been sung by Hariharan.

Release 
The film received mostly positive reviews from critics. The Hindu applauded the off-beat attempt stating, "A film without predictable ingredients is a rarity. The Kasi team has to be appreciated for its boldness, in telling a story, in a simple, straight forward manner without the evitable distractions". While Vikram's portrayal was appreciated, "As a blind man, with his eyeballs completely in and with facial twitches so typical of the visually impaired, his portrait is realistic", the two lead actress too received acclaim, "Kavya Madhavan and Kaveri, have excellently expressive eyes, which have been put to good use". S. R. Ashok Kumar said, "As the blind Kasi, he touched a chord". Sify noted, "Vikram, it goes without saying that he is the life and soul of Kasi. As the blind singer, he brings laughter, tears and a lump in one’s throat. Vikram has given an extraordinarily detailed performance, which only a Kamalhassan can do!" and summed up saying it's an emotionally powerful movie. Balaji Balasubramaniam wrote, "The movie is populated with characters that have a big effect, both positive and negative, on us".

Kasi was commercially successful as well.

Awards

References

External links 
 

2001 films
Films about blind people in India
Films scored by Ilaiyaraaja
2000s Tamil-language films
Films about disability in India
Tamil remakes of Malayalam films
Films directed by Vinayan